Steinach (b Rothenburg ob der Tauber) station is a station on the Treuchtlingen–Würzburg,  and the . It is classified by Deutsche Bahn as a category 4 station and has five platform tracks. Steinach (b. Rothenburg od T.) is a district of the municipality of Gallmersgarten in the German state of Bavaria. The station is located in the network area of the Greater Nuremberg Transport Association. The station is not barrier-free.

History

The Ansbach-Würzburg line existed before the station building, which was opened on 1 July 1864. The station was built from 1862 until the end of 1864 and became operational on 1865. The station building is a three-storey building with a hip roof and low wings, built of quarried stone with Haustein (a stone used in masonry in Germany) trimmings and dentils made of brick.  The line to Rothenburg ob der Tauber was opened in November 1873.  The line to Neustadt an der Aisch was opened in 1898.

Services

The Mainfrankenbahn services are operate with Alstom Coradia Continental (class 440) electric multiple units. The Aischgrund-Bahn and Rothenburg-Bahn services are operated with Alstom Coradia LINT 41 (class 648) diesel multiple units. All lines are operated by DB Regio Bayern.

Notes

Railway stations in Bavaria
Railway stations in Germany opened in 1865
Buildings and structures in Neustadt (Aisch)-Bad Windsheim